Mahjerd (also known as Mahjerdū’īyeh and Mehjerdī) is a village in Raviz Rural District, Koshkuiyeh District, Rafsanjan County, Kerman Province, Iran. At the 2006 census, its population was 14, in 5 families.

References 

Populated places in Rafsanjan County